Eastwood is a ghost town in San Diego County, California.  It was located a mile northwest of Julian, near Eastwood Creek.

History
Eastwood was a town site planned by Joseph Stancliff as a rival to Julian.  His attempt failed and his town survived only in the name of Eastwood Creek and Eastwood Hill, above it to the north.

References

Former settlements in San Diego County, California
Populated places established in 1870
Ghost towns in California
History of San Diego
1870 establishments in California